Jean de La Chapelle (24 October 1651 – 29 May 1723) was a French writer and dramatist. He was born at Bourges, France, was elected to the Académie française in 1688, and died in Paris.

Biography

Born into minor nobility, nephew of Nicolas Boileau, his literary talents attracted the attention of Louis Armand, prince of Bourbon-Conti, whose assistant he became in 1678. Louis XIV of France gave him a number of diplomatic missions to Switzerland to negotiate agreements with the government at Neufchâtel.

Benefiting from a sizeable personal fortune, La Chapelle wrote and staged tragedies inspired by classical antiquity at the Comédie-Française: Zaïde, Téléphonte, Cléopâtre, Ajax. His connections and the skill of the actor Michel Baron brought them success in the theatre, but none survived to join the standard repertoire.

A small prose comedy, Les Carrosses d'Orléans (1680), was on the other hand a genuine success and was frequently staged. It was later adapted into a popular English hit The Stage Coach by George Farquhar and Peter Motteux.

La Chapelle published two novels, Les Amours de Catulle (1680) and Les Amours de Tibulle (1700), both dry collections of translations from the Latin poets Catullus and Tibullus respectively.

In 1688, La Chapelle was elected chairman of the Académie française, succeeding Antoine Furetière.

In 1695 he purchased the Château of Sainte-Assise; he sold it in 1700 to Jean Glucq.

Works
Tragedies
 Cléopâtre (1681)
 Zaïde (1681)
 Téléphonte (1682)
 Ajax (1684)
 Isaac (1717)
Novels
 Les Amours de Catulle (1680)
 Marie d'Anjou, reine de Majorque (1682)
 Les Amours de Tibulle (1722)
Other
 Les Carrosses d'Orléans (1680)
 Lettres d'un Suisse à un Français, où l'on voit les véritables intérêts des princes et des nations de l'Europe (1703-1711)
 Réflexions politiques et historiques sur l'affaire des princes, avec la requête des pairs de France, la requête des princes légitimez et une réponse à cette dernière requête (1717)

External links
 
La Chapelle's tragedies
Académie Française: Biographical note (in French)

1651 births
1723 deaths
Writers from Bourges
17th-century French male writers
18th-century French writers
18th-century French male writers
Members of the Académie Française
17th-century French dramatists and playwrights
18th-century French dramatists and playwrights